Sir William John Ritchie Simpson  (27 April 1855 – 20 September 1931) was a Scottish physician and specialist in tropical medicine.

Early years

William John Ritchie Simpson was born in Glasgow, Scotland, the son of John Simpson. 
He attended school in Jersey.
He was admitted to the University of Aberdeen, and graduated in 1876 as Bachelor of Medicine, Master of Surgery.
He seems to have been a medical assistant in a Huddersfield practice, and around 1878 worked at the Haydock Lodge Retreat.
Simpson moved to Kent, where he was Medical Officer for a district of the Dover poor law union and a public vaccinator.
Simpson also worked  the Samaritan Convalescent Home in Dover.
In 1800 he obtained his M.D. from Aberdeen and obtained a certificate in Sanitary Science (later Doctor of Public Health) from Cambridge.

Physician and health officer

In 1880 Simpson was appointed medical officer of health for Aberdeen. 
In 1886 he resigned from this position so he could study at King's College London.
From there he went to Kolkata, India, to become the first medical officer of health for that city.
In this position, which he held until 1897, he gained experience in tropical diseases.
In 1888 he married Isabella Mary Jane Jamieson.
She was the daughter of George Jamieson, the minister of St Machar's Cathedral, Aberdeen.
They had one son and one daughter.

Expert in tropical medicine

Simpson returned to London and in 1898 became professor of hygiene and lecturer in tropical medicine at King's College.
In 1899 he helped found the London School of Tropical Medicine, where he was a lecturer until 1923.
For several years he also gave lectures on hygiene at the London School of Medicine for Women.
Simpson became a fellow of the Society of Tropical Medicine and Hygiene in 1909.
He was on the society's council from 1911 to 1917, vice-president from 1917 to 1919 and president from 1919 to 1921.
He managed to have the society made a royal society.

In 1926 Simpson helped found the Ross Institute in Putney, London.
The institute continued the environment-based approach to mosquito control developed by Ronald Ross.
It primarily helped British businesses to resolve malaria problems.
Simpson left King's College in 1927.
He was the director of the Ross Institute and a physician to the associated Hospital for Tropical Diseases until his death in 1931.

Miscellaneous appointments

Simpson was a member of the Naval Medical Consultative Board, the Colonial Medical and Sanitary Committee, the Yellow Fever Commission in West Africa and the Government Commission on Enteric Fever in South Africa from 1900 to 1901 during the Second Boer War.
He investigated plague in Hong Kong in 1902, sanitation in Singapore in 1906 and plague and public health in West Africa in 1908. 
In 1913 he investigated plague and public health in East Africa, and was also a member of the commission on plague in West Africa. 
In 1924 he wrote a report on sanitation and plague in the mining districts of the Gold Coast.
The Roan Antelope Copper Mine in Northern Rhodesia (now Zambia) experienced a high death rate during construction between 1927 and 1930.
In 1929 the managers of the mining company in London arranged for the Ross Institute for Tropical Diseases to send an expedition led by Simpson to find what was causing the deaths.

Death

Simpson died of pneumonia on 20 September 1931 at the Ross Institute.
His biographer writes that "Simpson was a man of great industry and an inflexible purpose that sometimes led to clashes with his associates."
Simpson sometimes ignored local knowledge and cultural concerns, and created resistance to his sanitary reforms through his insensitivity.
He considered that the origins of plague or cholera bacilli were the bodies and homes of poor colonial workers.
His solution was often to destroy large parts of colonial cities and to rebuild them according to current theories of sanitation.
The poor were often forced to relocate.

Publications

Honors

 Croonian Lecturer at the Royal College of Physicians in 1907.
 Companion of the Order of St Michael and St George (C.M.G.) in 1909  for services on various missions in connection with plague and the promotion of public health in the Colonies
 Serbian Order of St. Sava in 1919 for services to Serbia during the War.
 Knight Bachelor in 1923 as a member of the Colonial Advisory Medical and Sanitary Committee

Notes

Citations

Sources

1855 births
1931 deaths
Medical doctors from Glasgow
19th-century Scottish medical doctors
20th-century Scottish medical doctors
Academics of the London School of Hygiene & Tropical Medicine
Companions of the Order of St Michael and St George
Knights Bachelor
Presidents of the Royal Society of Tropical Medicine and Hygiene